HD 191104 is a star system in the equatorial constellation of Aquila. Two of the components form a close spectroscopic binary system, while a third star, also thought to be a spectroscopic binary, orbits the pair at a greater distance.

References

External links
 HR 7693
 Image HD 191104

Aquila (constellation)
191104
4
7693
Durchmusterung objects
099158
F-type main-sequence stars